This is a list of Pakistani radio and television qaris. The "Late" after a name indicates that that person is deceased.



A
Abdullah Bukhari

F
Muhammad Farooq

G
Ghulam Rasool

K
Khursheed Ahmad

M
Qari Mohammad Ali madani ( khairpur sindh)

R
Rubina Khalid

S
Shakir Qasmi
Syed Sadaqat Ali

J
Junaid Jamshed

W
Waheed Zafar Qasmi

Y
Muhammad Yahya Rasool Nagari

Z
Zahir Qasmi

Pakistani Quran reciters